The enzyme sphinganine-1-phosphate aldolase catalyzes the chemical reaction

sphinganine 1-phosphate  phosphoethanolamine + palmitaldehyde

This enzyme belongs to the family of lyases, specifically the aldehyde-lyases, which cleave carbon-carbon bonds.  The systematic name of this enzyme class is sphinganine-1-phosphate palmitaldehyde-lyase (phosphoethanolamine-forming). Other names in common use include dihydrosphingosine 1-phosphate aldolase, sphinganine-1-phosphate alkanal-lyase, sphinganine-1-phosphate lyase, and sphinganine-1-phosphate palmitaldehyde-lyase.  This enzyme participates in sphingolipid metabolism.  It employs one cofactor, pyridoxal phosphate.

References

 

EC 4.1.2
Pyridoxal phosphate enzymes
Enzymes of unknown structure